Bartłomiej Bartnicki (born 26 February 1981 in Bydgoszcz) is a Polish Freestyle wrestler who competed in the 2008 Summer Olympics in Beijing and in the 2004 Summer Olympics.

At the 2008 Summer Olympics he finished 12th in the super-heavyweight competition (120 kg) in wrestling.

External links
 

1981 births
Living people
Polish male sport wrestlers
Olympic wrestlers of Poland
Wrestlers at the 2004 Summer Olympics
Wrestlers at the 2008 Summer Olympics
Sportspeople from Bydgoszcz